Ali Çetiner (born 5 July 1925, date of death unknown) was a Turkish cyclist. He competed in the individual and team road race events at the 1948 Summer Olympics.

References

External links
 

1925 births
Year of death missing
Turkish male cyclists
Olympic cyclists of Turkey
Cyclists at the 1948 Summer Olympics
Place of birth missing
20th-century Turkish people